Rabuan Pit is a Malaysian  sprinter from Merlimau, Melaka, Malaysia. He was the Gold medalist in the 100 Metres in the 1982  Asian Games. The second Malaysian to do so after Mani Jegathesan.

References

1956 births
Living people
Malaysian male sprinters
Asian Games gold medalists for Malaysia
Asian Games bronze medalists for Malaysia
Medalists at the 1982 Asian Games
Asian Games medalists in athletics (track and field)
Athletes (track and field) at the 1982 Asian Games
Southeast Asian Games medalists in athletics
Southeast Asian Games silver medalists for Malaysia
Competitors at the 1985 Southeast Asian Games